Field Dalling is a village and civil parish in the English county of Norfolk.

History
Dalling's name is of Anglo-Saxon and derives from the Old English for the settlement of Dalla's people. The prefix 'field' was added to distinguish from nearby Wood Dalling,  to the north-west.

Two possible sites of Roman settlement have been identified within the parish, with artefacts such as coins, pottery and brooches being unearthed which leads to the conclusion that Field Dalling was the site of Roman industrial activity.

In the Domesday Book, Field Dalling is listed as a settlement of 38 households in the hundred of Greenhoe. In 1086, the village was divided between the estates of King William I, Alan of Brittany and Roger Bigot.

During the Second World War, two spigot mortar emplacements were built in Field Dalling to provide anti-tank weaponry for the Home Guard to resist a potential German invasion of Great Britain.

Geography
According to the 2011 Census, Field Dalling with Saxlingham has a population of 285 residents living in 139 households.

Felmingham falls within the constituency of North Norfolk and is represented at Parliament by Duncan Baker MP of the Conservative Party. For the purposes of local government, the parish falls within the district of North Norfolk.

St. Andrew's Church
Field Dalling's parish church is dedicated to Saint Andrew, with the tower dating from the Fourteenth Century and the nave and chancel dating from the Fifteenth Century. The font dates from the Fifteenth Century with the stained-glass, largely the work of William Warrington, depicting the Good Samaritan, Parable of the Sower and the Crucifixion.

Amenities
The village has experienced a slow decline over the years; the primary school closed in 1977, the last pub in the village closed in 1986, and the post office and shop had closed down by the end of the 1990s. Apart from the church, the playground/recreation area and the village hall are the only amenities left in Field Dalling today. However, on occasions the village hall has hosted 'pub nights'. In the past there were amenities such as a bigger playing field, a football team, and a reading room.

Currently new houses for rent are being built just off the Holt Road as part of a Victory Housing Trust scheme.

War memorial
Field Dalling's war memorial takes the form of a bronze plaque with a wooden backing located inside St. Andrew's Church. The memorial lists the following names for the First World War:
 2-Lt. Roger M. Chaworth-Musters (1898-1917), No. 56 Squadron RFC
 Sto-1C. Richard Bridgwater (1895-1917), HMS Vanguard
 L-Cpl. William C. Bilham (d.1917), 11th Bn., Suffolk Regiment
 Pvt. Ernest W. Doughty (1887-1919), 6th Bn., Essex Regiment
 Pvt. Herbert Cooke (d.1917), 10th Bn., Essex Regt.
 Pvt. Herbert G. Doughty (1889-1918), 10th Bn., Essex Regt.
 Pvt. Thomas S. Lucas (1898-1918), 1st Bn., Leicestershire Regiment
 Pvt. Ernest R. Knights (1886-1918), 1st Bn., Royal Norfolk Regiment

References

External links

Villages in Norfolk
North Norfolk
Civil parishes in Norfolk